Jón Arnar Ingvarsson (born 3 June 1972) is an Icelandic former professional basketball player and coach. He spent the majority of his career with Haukar in the Úrvalsdeild karla. He retired as the Úrvalsdeild all-time leader in assists but has since been surpassed by Justin Shouse.

Playing career

Club career
Jón Arnar started his senior career in 1988, at the age of 16, with Haukar, where he spent the first 10 years of his career, winning the Icelandic Cup with the club in 1996. The same year he led the Úrvalsdeild in assists and was named to the Úrvalsdeild Domestic All-First team. In January 1998, he left the club and signed with Castors Braine in Belgium. He returned to Haukar the next season and stayed there until 2002, when he took over Breiðablik as player-coach. He retired as player in 2004.

National team career
Jón Arnar played 102 games for the Icelandic national team from 1990 to 2000.

Coaching career
Jón Arnar was hired as the head coach of Haukar in November 1998, replacing recently fired Einar Einarsson. He coached the team for the rest of the season, accumulating a 4-10 record.

He took over as the head coach of Breiðablik in 2002. After two seasons in the Úrvalsdeild, the club was relegated to 1. deild karla in 2004. After a disappointing start of the 2005–2006 season, the board of Breiðablik fired Jón Arnar in December 2005.

Jón Arnar was hired as the head coach of ÍR in 2006 and led them to victory in the Icelandic Cup in his first season. In December 2009, he stepped down as the head coach due to his wife's illness. He returned to ÍR in April 2012 when he signed a 2-year contract with the club. He stepped down as the head coach of the club on 1 February 2013 after a disappointing tenure with the team in last place.

Personal life
Jón Arnar is the son of Ingvar Jónsson, a former player and coach for Haukar. His brother, Pétur Ingvarsson, played 26 games for the national team. Jón Arnar's son is Kári Jónsson, a professional basketball player.

References

External links
Úrvalsdeild statistics at kki.is

1972 births
Living people
Jón Arnar Ingvarsson
Jón Arnar Ingvarsson
Jón Arnar Ingvarsson
Jón Arnar Ingvarsson
Jón Arnar Ingvarsson
Jón Arnar Ingvarsson
Jón Arnar Ingvarsson
Jón Arnar Ingvarsson
Jón Arnar Ingvarsson
Jón Arnar Ingvarsson
Jón Arnar Ingvarsson
Point guards